Oborishte is an urban district located in the centre of the Bulgarian capital Sofia.  the population is 36,000.
It has an area of 3.07 km², of which streets and squares encompass 59 ha, parks and gardens 47 ha, schools and kindergartens 9 ha, hospitals and polyclinics 5 ha, embassies 1.5 ha, theatres 1 ha, petrol stations and parkings 2.5 ha, churches 1 ha, administrative buildings 16 ha and residential areas 164 ha.

A large part of the population is engaged in government and administration. There are several ministries and other important institutions including the Council of Ministers, the Ministry of Regional and Public Development, the Ministry of Education, the Social Ministry, the Energetics Committee, the Capital Municipality, the Parliament building, the State Archive Bureau and many embassies and others.

Three institutions for higher education are located in the district: the National Academy of Arts, the State Academy of Music and the Military Academy Georgi Sava Rakovski. There are 12 schools, 6 kindergartens and 3 chitalishta.

Culture 

The municipal area occupies the eastern part of the City centre including some parts of ancient Serdica. Many cultural institutions and monuments of national importance are located in Oborishte including 15 monuments (Monument to Vasil Levski, Monument to the Unknown Soldier, Monuments to SS Cyril and Methodius, Doctors, Aleksandar Stamboliyski, Ivan Vazov and others), 40 memorial plates, 211 Monuments of Culture and 9 churches.

Cultural Institutions:

State Musical Theatre "St. Makedonski"
Dramatic Theatre "Sofia"
Lesser City Theatre
State Puppet Theatre-Salon 2
Theatre Workshop "Sfumato"
"Levski" Cinema
"Serdica" Cinema
"Moderen Teatar" Cinema
House of Cinema
SS. Cyril and Methodius National Library
National Gallery for Foreign Art
National Museum of Military History

Churches include: 
Alexander Nevsky Cathedral
Hagia Sophia Church
Church of St Petka
Church of St Paraskeva (Sofia)

The Holy Synod and the Apostolic Nunciature are also located here.

References 

Districts of Sofia